Federico Gatti (born 24 June 1998) is an Italian professional footballer who plays as a centre-back for  club Juventus and the Italy national team.

In his youth career, Gatti played for the clubs Chieri, Torino and Alessandria. Gatti's senior career began with in February 2015, when he joined Promozione team Pavarolo, who gained promotion to Eccellenza in the next season. In mid-2016, Gatti joined Saluzzo but returned to Pavarolo six months later. Gatti remained at Pavarolo until 2018, when he changed his position from midfielder to defender during the last matches of the season. He then moved to Verbania, who won the Eccellenza title and were promoted to Serie D in the 2018–19 season. Gatti made his professional debut with Serie C side Pro Patria and he joined Serie B side Frosinone the following year. In January 2022, Gatti joined Juventus, who loaned him back to Frosinone until the end of the season.

Gatti did not represent Italy at youth levels and he won his sole cap for the senior team in 2022.

Club career

Youth career 
In 2005, aged seven, Federico Gatti played in a friendly match for Chieri against Torino; Giorgio Boscarato, Torino's sporting observer, noted his talent as a trequartista and reported him to Silvano Benedetti, the Torino Youth Sector sporting director who ultimately signed him. Gatti was promoted to the under-15s side before moving on to Alessandria's youth team. Gatti spent the 2012–13 and 2013–14 seasons with the club's under-15s (Giovanissimi Nazionali) side and with the under-17s (Allievi) team.

Throughout his youth career, Gatti was not considered by Torino nor by Alessandria. Gatti was sent on loan to Pavarolo in the 2014–15 season. Instead of playing with the under-17s side, Gatti spent most of the season playing for the under-19s (Juniores) team, with whom he scored 13 goals in 18 league appearances despite being only 17 years old.

Amateur career 
In February 2015, Federico Gatti debuted with the first team, with whom he made four appearances that season. The following season, Gatti was promoted to the first team and scored three goals in 27 Promozione appearances; he also won the award for the Best Youth Player of the season. His side were also promoted to Eccellenza, having won the Coppa Italia Promozione Piemonte–Valle d'Aosta.

In 2016, Alessandria loaned Gatti to Saluzzo but not having found much space, Gatti returned to Pavarolo in mid-January 2017. At the end of the season, Pavarolo avoided relegation to Promozione. During the 2016–17 season, Gatti scored eight goals in 31 league appearances.

In the following season (2017–18), due to financial problems, Pavarolo could not pay its players so the most-experienced players decided not to train or play in the last 10 league matches, and the under-19s team were promoted to the first team. Because Gatti was the tallest player on the squad, he changed his position from midfielder to defender. Gatti's side were relegated to Promozione at the end of the season.

Verbania were impressed by Gatti's performances as a defender in a match against them, and they purchased him on a permanent contract in 2018. Gatti scored one goal in 34 league appearances and Verbania won the Eccellenza title. Gatti impressed Serie C side Cavese, who tried to purchase him but did not. In the following season (2019–20), Gatti scored three goals in 22 Serie D appearances prior to the interruption caused by the COVID-19 pandemic in Italy, and his side were relegated to Eccellenza.

Pro Patria and Frosinone 

In mid-2020, Gatti became a professional player and signed to Serie C side Pro Patria. On 30 September, he debuted for Pro Patria in a 3–2 second-round Coppa Italia match that was lost against Vicenza after extra time.  Gatti's first Serie C match was on 4 October, a 1–1 draw with Pro Vercelli. His only goal for Pro Patria came on 3 April 2021, which allowed his team to win 1–0 against Lecco. On 9 May, Gatti played his last game of the season in a Serie C promotion play-off match against Juventus U23—the reserve team of Juventus—in a match lost 3–1 at home, causing Pro Patria's elimination from the play-offs in the first round. During the season, Gatti played 36 matches, almost all of them 90 minutes long.

Gatti moved to Serie B side Frosinone in 2021, signing a four-year contract for a fee of €250,000. Gatti made his debut on 15 August in the Coppa Italia first-round match against Venezia, which finished 1–1 and Gatti missed his penalty in the penalty shoot-out, losing 8–7. Gatti's Serie B debut came on 20 August, in which he played as a starter in a 2–2 draw against Parma. Gatti's first goal for Frosinone came on 23 October in a 2–1 win against Ascoli. On 4 December, Gatti was sent off after twice being yellow carded in two minutes of an eventual 1–1 draw against Ternana. Gatti's returned to the pitch after his one-match suspension caused by a red card on 18 December in Frosinone's 4–0 win against SPAL, in which he scored two goals.

Gatti had been close to a transfer move to Turin rivals Torino before Juventus entered the negotiations and bought him on 31 January 2022 in a four-and-a-half-year deal for a fee of €7.5 million plus €2.5 million in performance-related bonuses. After signing Gatti, Juventus promptly loaned him back to Frosinone for the rest of the season. Gatti finished the season with five goals scored in 36 matches in all competitions; he also received 13 yellow cards. He started matches 35 times and all of his appearances, except for the match against Ternana in which he was red-carded, were 90 minutes long. On 17 October, he received the Serie B Footballer of the Year award for the 2021–22 Serie B.

Juventus 
Gatti made his Juventus and Serie A debut on 31 August 2022 against Spezia, winning 2–0. On 25 October, he made his Champions League debut in a 4–3 defeat against Benfica.

International career 
In May 2022, Italy's coach Roberto Mancini  called up Gatti for a three-day training camp in Coverciano. His Italy debut came on 11 June, when he was chosen as a starter in a UEFA Nations League match against England. The match ended 0–0, Italy struggling against England's strikers Tammy Abraham and Harry Kane, and Gatti was considered a "veteran" by Italian newspaper Corriere della Sera in the post-match report.

Style of play 
According to Andrea Gigante writing for 90min.com, attributed Gatti's technique and vision to previous experience as a midfielder; he also has a strong personality and is strong in the air. According to Domenico Marchese writing for La Repubblica, Gatti excels at man-to-man marking. According to Pro Patria sporting director Sandro Turotti, Gatti can play in a four-man defence and can also play centre-right in a three-man defence as he did for Pro Patria. Frosinone sporting director Guido Angelozzi drew comparisons between Gatti and Juventus' centre-back duo, defining Gatti as "a [Giorgio] Chiellini with [Leonardo] Bonucci's feet".

Personal life 
Gatti is an only child; his father Ludovico was a sporting director during his experience at Pavarolo.

At the age of 17, Federico Gatti left school and started working, following his father's unemployment. Gatti worked as a bricklayer and as window manufacturer, repaired roofs and worked at markets for nine-to-ten hours a day until 2018. Gatti would train in the evenings, having dinner at 23:00 and would get up between 03:00 and 04:00. Gatti's career has also been compared to that of Moreno Torricelli, who played amateur football and was a joiner before signing with Juventus in 1992.

Gatti considers Juventus' defender Giorgio Chiellini as his idol. Prior to switching positions from midfielder to defender, Frank Lampard, Steven Gerrard, Adel Taarabt and Radja Nainggolan had been his idols.

Career statistics

Club

International

Honours 
Pavarolo
 Coppa Italia Promozione Piemonte–Valle d'Aosta: 2015–16

Verbania
 Eccellenza Group A: 

Individual
 Serie B Footballer of the Year: 2021–22

References

External links 

 Profile at the Juventus F.C. website
 

Living people
1998 births
People from Rivoli, Piedmont
Footballers from Piedmont
Italian footballers
Association football defenders
A.S.D. Calcio Chieri 1955 players
Torino F.C. players
U.S. Alessandria Calcio 1912 players
A.C.S.D. Saluzzo players
S.S. Verbania Calcio players
Aurora Pro Patria 1919 players
Frosinone Calcio players
Juventus F.C. players
Promozione players
Eccellenza players
Serie D players
Serie C players
Serie B players
Sportspeople from the Metropolitan City of Turin
Italy international footballers